Nancy Garden (May 15, 1938 – June 23, 2014) was an American writer of fiction for children and young adults, best known for the lesbian novel Annie on My Mind. She received the 2003 Margaret Edwards Award from the American Library Association recognizing her lifetime contribution in writing for teens, citing Annie alone.

Annie On My Mind was awarded the Lee Lynch Classic Award by the Golden Crown Literary Society in 2014, cited as one of the most important classics in lesbian literature.

Biography
Garden was born in 1938 in Boston. She was an only child who "took refuge in books, in writing, and in telling long stories to myself and sometimes acting them out." She earned a B.F.A. (1961) and an M.A. (1962) from Columbia University School of Dramatic Arts. Through school and for several years after college, Garden worked in theater, supplementing the work with odd jobs in offices. This includes freelance editorial work for various publishers. Garden began her writing career as an assistant editor in Scholastic Magazine in New York, NY. By 1970, Garden had risen to associate editor. She moved on to be an editor at Houghton Mifflin CO in Boston, MA between 1971 and 1976. She later visited and gave talks at schools and libraries, teaching children about writing. She has also written non-fiction, mystery and fantasy for children and young adults.

Garden is best known for Annie on My Mind, published by Farrar, Straus and Giroux in 1982. It was critically acclaimed but attracted controversy because of its lesbian characters, Annie and Liza, who fall in love. It was one of the first teen novels to feature lesbian characters in a positive light. "I wrote it to give solace to young gay people, to let them know they were not alone, that they could be happy and well adjusted and also to let heterosexual kids know that we gay people aren't monsters," she told Booklist in a 1996 interview.

In 1993, Annie on My Mind was banned by the Kansas City school system and burnt in demonstrations. It was returned to shelves only after a First Amendment lawsuit by students in 1995. It is #44 on the American Library Association list of 100 books most frequently challenged during the 1990s.

Garden received the Robert B. Downs Award for Intellectual Freedom in 2001 from the University of Illinois Graduate School of Library and Information Science.

The ALA Margaret A. Edwards Award recognizes one writer and a particular body of work "for significant and lasting contribution to young adult literature." Garden won the annual award in 2003, when the panel cited Annie on My Mind alone and called her "the first author for young adults to create a lesbian love story with a positive ending ... Using a fluid, readable style, Garden opens a window through which readers can find courage to be true to themselves." Five years later Garden recalled that "I was and still am enormously grateful ... for YALSA’s recognition ... of the importance of YA books about LGBT youth."

Garden's reviews of young adult titles have appeared in the Lambda Literary Foundation's Lambda Book Report.

She spent many years living between Massachusetts and Maine, with partner Sandy Scott, their golden retriever, Loki, and their cats.

Death
Nancy Garden died of a heart attack on June 23, 2014, aged 76.

Works

Nonfiction 

 Berlin: City Split in Two (Putnam's, 1971)
 Fun with Weather Forecasting, illus. Dorothea Sierra (Houghton Mifflin, 1973)
 The Kids' Code and Cipher Book (1988)
 Weird and Horrible series
 Vampires (1973)
 Werewolves (1973)
 Witches (1975)
 Devils and Demons (1976)

Fiction

What Happened in Marston (1971)
The Loners (1972)
Mist Maiden (1975)
Annie on My Mind (1982)
Maria's Mountain (1983)
Prisoner of Vampires (1984)
Peace, O River (1986)
Lark in the Morning (1991)
My Sister, the Vampire (1992)
Dove and Sword: A Novel of Joan of Arc (1995)
My Brother, the Werewolf (1995)
Good Moon Rising (1996)
The Year They Burned the Books (1999)
Holly's Secret (2000)
Prisoners of Vampires (2001)
Nora and Liz (2002)
Meeting Melanie (2002)
Molly's Family (2004)
Endgame (2006)
Hear Us Out! (2007)
 Fours Crossing series
 Fours Crossing (1981)
 Watersmeet (1983)
 The Door Between (1987)
 Monster Hunters 
 Mystery of the Night Raiders (1987)
 Mystery of the Midnight Menace (1988)
 Mystery of the Secret Marks (1989) 
 Mystery of the Kidnapped Kidnapper (1994)
 Mystery of the Watchful Witches (1995)

 Candlestone Inn 
 The Case of the Stolen Scarab (2004)
 The Case of the Vanishing Valuables (2010)

References

External links
 
 
 
 

1938 births
American children's writers
Lambda Literary Award winners
American lesbian writers
2014 deaths
Margaret A. Edwards Award winners
American writers of young adult literature
Place of death missing
American women children's writers
Women writers of young adult literature
LGBT people from Massachusetts
21st-century American women writers